Kalinovka is a rural locality (a settlement) in Korotoyaksky Selsoviet, Khabarsky District, Altai Krai, Russia. The population was 40 as of 2013. It was founded in 1926. There is 1 street.

Geography 
Kalinovka is located 15 km northeast of Khabary (the district's administrative centre) by road. Korotoyak is the nearest rural locality.

References 

Rural localities in Khabarsky District